Kevin Gilbert may refer to:

Kevin Gilbert (musician) (1966–1996), American musician
Kevin Gilbert (author) (1933–1993), Aboriginal Australian writer.